is a railway station in  Nishi-ku, Nagoya, Aichi Prefecture, Japan, operated by the Tōkai Transport Service Company (TKJ).

Lines

Station layout
The station has two opposed elevated island platforms with the station building underneath. The station building has automated ticket machines, TOICA automated turnstiles and is unattended.

Platforms

Adjacent stations

|-
!colspan=5|Tōkai Transport Service Company

Station history
Hira Station was opened on 1 December 1991.

Passenger statistics
In fiscal 2017, the station was used by an average of 115 passengers daily.

Surrounding area
Site of Hira Castle
Hira Elementary School

See also
 List of Railway Stations in Japan

References

External links

Railway stations in Japan opened in 1991
Railway stations in Nagoya